Revival is a small settlement, around 15 kilometers from Negril and has not seen many tourists yet. The area is nice wooded and most in natural state. Revival is located on the southern west coast of Jamaica in Westmoreland Parish.

populated coastal places in Jamaica
populated places in Jamaica